The Keka-class patrol boats are vessels designed by ASC Pty. Ltd. (formerly named Australian Submarine Corporation) originally for the Royal Thai Navy (3 vessels).  A second variant series was designed for the Hong Kong Marine Police (6 vessels).

Royal Thai Navy

Australian company ASC and Thai company Silkline International formed a joint venture to build three Keka-class patrol boats for the Royal Thai Navy at Silkline's yard at Pak Nam Pran, Prachaub Krirkhan, Thailand.

Series T.81
The Keka-class vessels for the Royal Thai Navy are designated as the T.81 Series and have the following characteristics:

 Displacement: normal load 95 tonnes; full load 110 tonnes
 Armament: 40/60 Bofors; Oerlikon GAM-C01 20 mm, 2 x 0.50" machine gun
 Main Engines: 2 x MTU 16V2000 TE90
 Radar: Anritsu

Hong Kong Marine Police

The Hong Kong Marine Police had a programme to replace 35 patrol boats that had previously been delivered between 1980 and 1992. The first to be replaced were the Damen Mk I class for which the ASC designed Keka class was chosen.  They were built by Cheoy Lee Shipyards in Hong Kong and in their yard in mainland China between 2000 and 2005. They were ordered in two batches of two and four boats.

Vessels

References

External links 
 
 
 

Patrol boat classes
Hong Kong Police Force
Patrol vessels of Thailand